Hermann Schüssler or Schussler (August 4, 1842 – April 27, 1919) was a German civil engineer and designer of dams, famous for designing the Crystal Springs Dam and Comstock water system.

Early years
Hermann Schussler was born in what is today Rastede, Germany. From 1859 to 1862 he visited the Prussian Military Academy of Oldenburg. After his graduation he studied civil engineering in Zürich and Karlsruhe.

Engineer in USA

In 1864 Hermann Schussler immigrated to California, and started working for the Spring Valley Water Works of San Francisco. He worked on several projects in the Bay Area. Remarkable projects are the dams at Crystal Springs Reservoir and San Andreas Lake which survived the 1906 San Francisco earthquake. Schussler became chief engineer of Marin County, and later of Virginia City. In Virginia City, Schussler worked for Virginia and Gold Hill Water Company and build the Comstock water system. He also worked for the Sutro Tunnel Company and designed the water system for Tuscarora and Pioche. In 1878 Schussler worked on several water projects in Hawaii. He retired in 1914.

External links
 Herman Schussler and the Comstock Water System 
 Hermann Schussler: No Ordinary Man 
 
 
 The Daily Journal: A water-systems engineer and architect of dams, June 8, 2009.

References
 John Debo Galloway: Early Engineering Works Contributory to the Comstock, 1947.
 Hermann Schussler:  The Water Supply Of San Francisco, California Before, During And After The Earthquake of April 18, 1906 And The Subsequent Conflagration, 1907.
 Hugh Shamberger: The Story of the Water supply for the Comstock, 1965.

1842 births
1919 deaths
Karlsruhe Institute of Technology alumni
Water in California
German emigrants to the United States
Concrete pioneers